This article contains lists of named passenger trains in the United Kingdom. These are specific regular journeys identified by a special name in the timetable, not to be confused with the names of engines or individual physical train rakes. One-off charter and sporadic special trains are not included.

The National Railway Museum, York, has a wall in the Great Hall where the headboards of a number of named trains are displayed. These include:

ANGLO-SCOTTISH CAR CARRIER, BRISTOLIAN*, BROADSMAN*, CALEDONIAN*, CAMBRIAN RADIO CRUISE, CAPITALS LIMITED*+, CAPITALS UNITED EXPRESS, CHELTENHAM FLYER, COMET*, CONDOR (a named freight train, derived from CONtainer DOoR-to-Door), CORNISH RIVIERA EXPRESS, CORNISHMAN*, CTAC SCOTTISH TOURS EXPRESS+, CUNARD SPECIAL+, DAY CONTINENTAL*, DEVONIAN*, EAST ANGLIAN*, EMERALD ISLE EXPRESS, EMPRESS VOYAGER+, FAIR MAID*+, FENMAN*, HARROGATE SUNDAY PULLMAN*, HEART OF MIDLOTHIAN*, INTER-CITY*, IRISH MAIL*, LAKES EXPRESS*, LANCASTRIAN*, MANXMAN*+, MASTER CUTLER*, MAYFLOWER*, MERSEYSIDE EXPRESS*+, MID-DAY SCOT*+, MIDLANDER*, NIGHT SCOTSMAN*, NORFOLKMAN*, NORSEMAN*, NORTH BRITON*, NORTH YORKSHIREMAN*, NORTHERN IRISHMAN*+, NORTHUMBRIAN*+, PALATINE*, PEMBROKE COAST EXPRESS+, QUEEN OF SCOTS*, RED DRAGON*, RED ROSE*, ROBIN HOOD*+, ROYAL DUCHY*, ROYAL HIGHLANDER*+, SCARBOROUGH FLIER, SCARBOROUGH FLYER*, SHAMROCK*+, SOUTH WALES PULLMAN*, TEES-THAMES*, THAMES-CLYDE EXPRESS*, TORBAY EXPRESS, ULSTER EXPRESS, WELSH CHIEFTAIN*, WELSHMAN*, WEST RIDING*

* indicates that the name is prefixed by "THE".

+ indicates that more than one version is on display.

See also railwaybritain.co.uk for a description of a number of Boat Trains, some of which are included in the lists above.

Notes

Works cited
 

 

United Kingdom
 List
Named passenger trains